William J. Riley (October 6, 1921 in Medford, Massachusetts – February 16, 2000) was an ice hockey player.  Riley helped lead Dartmouth College to two Frozen Fours during his career.  He was inducted into the United States Hockey Hall of Fame in 1977.  His brothers John and Joe are also in the USHOF.

Awards and honors

References

External links
 United States Hockey Hall of Fame bio
 Genealogy Bank

1921 births
2000 deaths
American men's ice hockey forwards
Ice hockey players from Massachusetts
Sportspeople from Medford, Massachusetts
United States Hockey Hall of Fame inductees
AHCA Division I men's ice hockey All-Americans